Claudette Ortiz (born July 21, 1981) is an American singer, model and television personality, best known as a member of the R&B trio City High. Ortiz also was a castmate in TV One's reality series R&B Divas: Los Angeles.

Biography

Early life and career beginnings
Ortiz is of Puerto Rican descent and was born on July 21, 1981, and raised in Willingboro Township, New Jersey, where she attended Willingboro High School, as did the other members of City High.

2001–2003: City High
City High began with Pardlo signing on as a solo artist. However, soon Pardlo's friend Toby and the producers decided that it should be a two-man group featured on the album. Soon after the two-man group began to work on their album the group became successful. In order to stand out, the producers decided to add a female member. They chose Ortiz, another group member who also attended Willingboro High School. During production, all three members did writing on the songs. The trio focused on trying to make lyrics that told a story, Toby noting that he got some inspiration for writing songs that tell stories from country music. A large number of the songs are based on real-life experiences the trio has experienced, such as "What Would You Do?".
The group recorded "What Would You Do?" two years prior to the release of album, as it was featured in the Eddie Murphy film Life. It was not formally released, however, until 2001. The group disbanded in 2003, failing to release another album despite their debut's success.

In November 2002, Ortiz appeared on the episode "Jr's Dating Dilemma" on ABC's My Wife and Kids.

2004–present: Solo career and reality television
In 2006, Ortiz released her first solo single "Can't Get Enough" featuring Mase. She was also featured on Wyclef Jean's track "Dance Like This" on the Dirty Dancing: Havana Nights soundtrack. Other artists she has worked with include Nas, Ja Rule and Mase.

Claudette worked with producers will.i.am, Pharrell, So Klassik, Noize Trip, & Jerry Wonda for her postponed debut album around 2014.

"I've been working in between my kids. I was on Interscope but they didn't like the material; after I had Bella they released me. I'd just been waiting for her to get a little bigger & stronger. She'll be 2 in April. So I'm back working... Anton Marchand is managing me and I'm in talks with an independent label... I'm about to go hard and I'm excited! I feel good, I'm happy, I'm single... I've been in a relationship most of my adult life... I'm not dating. I'm just enjoying delving into myself. Learning more about me and focusing on my kids.

As of July 10, 2013, Ortiz is a castmate in TV One's reality show R&B Divas: Los Angeles, also featuring Chanté Moore, Michel'le, Lil' Mo, Dawn Robinson, and Kelly Price.

As of March 27, 2015, Ortiz will be starring in Tyler Perry's new stage play Madea on the Run.

She has also landed a recurring role as Claudia on Tyler Perry's If Loving You Is Wrong.

Personal life
In an interview Ortiz spoke about her daughter and how she did not know the guy reported by the media as her daughter's father. "So hold on… you don’t know that guy that is being reported as your daughter’s father?" Claudette Ortiz: "No I don’t know who that is. I saw a rumor on Wikipedia a while back saying I was dating him and had a child by him… I was in the studio with Bryan Michael Cox and we were laughing about it… I wasn’t even pregnant with my daughter yet… I don’t know that guy and never met him. My daughter's father is just a normal hard working business man. He's not even in the industry."

In 2013, Ortiz was contemplating joining the U.S. Air Force Reserves, when she was contacted by TV One's producer Phil Thornton to do R&B Divas. She relocated her family from New Jersey to partake in the series.

Discography

Singles

As featured performer

See also

List of Puerto Ricans

References

External links

1981 births
American soul singers
Living people
People from Willingboro Township, New Jersey
Willingboro High School alumni
American people of Puerto Rican descent
Hispanic and Latino American musicians
American contemporary R&B singers
21st-century American women singers
21st-century American singers
Singers from New Jersey
Hispanic and Latino American women singers